Anita Pádár (born 30 March 1979 in Karcag) is a Hungarian football midfielder, currently playing for MTK in Noi NB I.She is a member of the Hungarian national team. She holds the national records in caps and scoring with 41 goals in 123 matches.

Honours
 Hungarian Women's League: 1995, 1998, 1999, 2000, 2002, 2003, 2006, 2007, 2008, 2012, 2013

References

1979 births
Living people
Hungarian women's footballers
Hungary women's international footballers
Renova players
László Kórház SC players
1. FC Femina players
MTK Hungária FC (women) players
FIFA Century Club
Expatriate women's footballers in Italy
Hungarian expatriate sportspeople in Italy
People from Karcag
Women's association football midfielders
Sportspeople from Jász-Nagykun-Szolnok County
Hungarian expatriate footballers